The women's discus throw event at the 2017 Summer Universiade was held on 23 and 24 August at the Taipei Municipal Stadium.

Medalists

Results

Qualification
Qualification: 55.00 m (Q) or at least 12 best (q) qualified for the final.

Final

References

Discus throw
2017